The Sunda Strait is the strait between the Indonesian islands of Java and Sumatra.  It connects the Java Sea with the Indian Ocean.

Etymology
The strait takes its name from the Sunda Kingdom, which ruled the western portion of Java (an area covering the present day West Java, Jakarta, Banten, and some of western Central Java) from 669 to around 1579.

The name also alludes to the Sundanese people native to West Java and Banten, as distinct from the Javanese people, who live mostly in Central and East Java.

Geography

It is essentially triangular in shape, with two large bays on its northern side. It is also very broad and deep at its southwestern end, but as it narrows to the northeast it becomes much shallower, with a minimum depth of only  in parts of its northeastern end.

The strait is notoriously difficult to navigate because of this shallowness, very strong tidal currents, sandbanks, and man-made obstructions such as oil platforms off the Java coast.

For centuries, the strait was an important shipping route, especially during the period when the Dutch East India Company used it as the gateway to the Spice Islands of Indonesia (1602–1799). However, its narrowness, shallowness, and lack of accurate charting make it unsuitable for many modern, large ships, most of which use the Strait of Malacca instead.

The strait is dotted with a number of islands, many of which are volcanic in origin.  They include: Sangiang (Thwart-the-Way), Sebesi, Sebuku, and Panaitan (Prince's).  The most famous of the islands, however, is Krakatoa, which exploded in 1883 in one of the deadliest and most destructive volcanic events in recorded history.  The islands in the strait and the nearby surrounding regions of Java and Sumatra were devastated in that eruption, primarily due to the intense pumice fall and the huge tsunamis the eruption caused.

The Krakatoa eruption drastically altered the topography of the strait, with as much as 18–21 km³ of ignimbrite being deposited over an area of 1.1 million km² around the volcano. Some areas, such as the coastal region of Java now incorporated into the Ujung Kulon National Park, have never been resettled, but much of the coastline is now very densely populated.  Aside from Krakatoa's sole remaining peak, Rakata, the Krakatoa Archipelago consists of the islands of Lang (Panjang or Rakata Kecil), Verlaten (Sertung), and most recently, Anak Krakatau, which emerged in 1927 from the original Krakatoa's shattered remains.

Battle of Sunda Strait
On March 1, 1942, the Battle of Sunda Strait—part of the larger Battle of the Java Sea—took place when the Allied cruisers HMAS Perth and USS Houston encountered a Japanese amphibious landing force near Bantam, commanded by Rear Admiral Kenzaburo Hara. That force included a light cruiser and eleven destroyers, four heavy cruisers and a light aircraft carrier. The two Allied cruisers were sunk, while a Japanese minesweeper and a transport vessel were sunk by friendly fire.

Planned bridge

In the 1960s proposals were made for a bridge across the Sunda Strait, and in the 1990s further suggestions arose. A new plan was announced in October 2007. This bridge would have a maximum span of 3 kilometers, around 50% longer than the current record holder, the 1915 Çanakkale Bridge. Construction was projected to begin in 2014 if funding of at least US$10 billion could be secured.

An accord was signed in April 2012 with China Railway Construction Corporation for an $11 billion road and double track rail bridge. However, in November 2014 the incoming government of President Joko Widodo shelved plans to build the bridge.

Islands in the strait

 Calmeyer
Krakatau Archipelago
 Anak Krakatau
 Krakatau, mostly destroyed volcanic island
 Danan (volcano), destroyed volcanic cone on Krakatau
 Perboewatan, destroyed volcanic cone on Krakatau
 Rakata, partially destroyed volcanic cone and remnant of original island
 Poolsche Hoed, destroyed in 1883 eruption of Krakatoa
 Panjang, or Rakata Ketjil (Lang)
 Sertung (Verlaten)
 Legundi
 Panaitan (Prince's Island)

 Sangiang (Thwart-the-way)
 Sebesi
 Sebuku
 Steers (island)
 Tabuan

Bays
 Lampung Bay, Sumatra
 Semangka Bay, Sumatra

Gallery of nearby important channels

See also
 Geostrategic context
 Andaman and Nicobar Command
 Andaman Sea
 Bay of Bengal
 Exclusive economic zone of Indonesia
 Exclusive economic zone of India

 Local context
 Sunda Straits Crisis
 Java Head
 Kra Canal
 Lombok Strait
 Makassar Strait
 Malaccamax
 List of road-rail bridges
 2018 Sunda Strait tsunami

References

 
Landforms of Banten
Landforms of Java
Landforms of Sumatra
Java Sea
Straits of the Indian Ocean
Western Indo-Pacific